Paratapinocyba is a genus of Asian dwarf spiders that was first described by H. Saito in 1986.

Species
 it contains two species:
Paratapinocyba kumadai Saito, 1986 (type) – Japan
Paratapinocyba oiwa (Saito, 1980) – Japan

See also
 List of Linyphiidae species (I–P)

References

Araneomorphae genera
Linyphiidae
Spiders of Asia